Anders Olsson may refer to:
 Anders Olsson (writer) (born 1949), Swedish writer and member of the Swedish Academy
 Anders Olsson (swimmer) (born 1965), Swedish swimmer and triathlete